Chongqing (  or  ; ; Sichuanese pronunciation: ,), alternately romanized as Chungking, is one of the four direct-administered municipalities of the People's Republic of China (PRC). The official abbreviation of the city, "", was approved by the State Council on 18 April 1997. This abbreviation is derived from the old name of a part of the Jialing River that runs through Chongqing and feeds into the Yangtze River. Chongqing is China’s major modernized manufacturing base, a financial center and an international transport hub in Western China. Geographically, Chongqing is strategically positioned as a gateway to China’s west, a key connection in the Yangtze River Economic Belt, and a strategic base for China’s Belt and Road Initiative.

Administratively, it is one of the four municipalities under the direct administration of the central government of the People's Republic of China (the other three are Beijing, Shanghai, and Tianjin), and the only such municipality located deep inland. The municipality of Chongqing, roughly the size of Austria, includes the city of Chongqing as well as various discontiguous cities. Due to a classification technicality, Chongqing municipality can claim to be the largest city proper in the worldthough it does not have the world's largest urban area. Chongqing is the only city in China with a permanent population of over 30 million, however this number includes a large rural population. Chongqing is the fourth largest Chinese city by urban population, with urban population of 16.34 million as of the 2020 estimation, after Shanghai, Beijing and Shenzhen. According to the 2010 census, Chongqing is the most populous Chinese municipality, and also the largest direct-controlled municipality in China, containing 26 districts, eight counties, and four autonomous counties.

During the Republic of China (ROC) era, Chongqing served as its wartime capital during the Second Sino-Japanese War (1937–1945). The current municipality was separated from Sichuan province on 14 March 1997 to help develop the central and western parts of China. 

Chongqing has an extensive history and a rich culture. As one of China's National Central Cities, it serves as a financial center of the Sichuan Basin and the upstream Yangtze. It is a major manufacturing and transportation center; a July 2012 report by the Economist Intelligence Unit described it as one of China's "13 emerging megalopolises".  Chongqing Jiangbei International Airport, a major aviation hub serving Chongqing metropolitan areas and Western China, is one of the top 50 busiest airports in the world, and the city's monorails system is the world's longest and busiest monorails system with the greatest number of stations (70). Chongqing is ranked as a Beta (global second-tier) city. Chongqing is also the headquarters of the Changan Automobile, one of the "Big Four" car manufacturers of China, and hosts more than 10 foreign consulates, making it the fifth major city to host more foreign representatives than any other city in China after Beijing, Shanghai, Guangzhou and Chengdu.

Chongqing is one of the top 50 cities in the world by scientific research outputs as tracked by the Nature Index, and home to several notable universities, including Chongqing University, Southwest University, Chongqing University of Posts and Telecommunications, Southwest University of Political Science and Law, Chongqing Normal University, Sichuan International Studies University, Sichuan Fine Arts Institute and Chongqing University of Technology.

History

Ancient history
Chongqing's location is historically associated with the State of Ba.
Its capital was first called Jiangzhou.

Imperial era
Jiangzhou subsequently remained under Qin Shi Huang's rule during the Qin dynasty, the successor of the Qin State, as well as the rule of Han dynasty emperors.
Jiangzhou was subsequently renamed during the Northern and Southern dynasties to Chu Prefecture, then again in 581 AD (Sui dynasty) to Yu Prefecture, and later in 1102 during Northern Song to Gong Prefecture. The name Yu however survives to this day as an abbreviation for Chongqing, as well as for the city's historic center, where the old town once stood; its name is Yuzhong (Central Yu). It received its current name in 1189, after Prince Zhao Dun of the Southern Song dynasty described his crowning as king and then Emperor Guangzong as a "double celebration" (or chóngqìng in short). To mark the occasion of his enthronement, Yu Prefecture was therefore converted to Chongqing Fu.

In 1362, (Yuan dynasty), Ming Yuzhen, a peasant rebel leader, established the Daxia Kingdom at Chongqing for a short time. In 1621 (Ming dynasty), another short-lived kingdom of Daliang was established by She Chongming with Chongqing as its capital. In 1644, after the fall of the Ming dynasty to a rebel army, Chongqing, together with the rest of Sichuan, was captured by Zhang Xianzhong, who was said to have massacred a large number of people in Sichuan and depopulated the province, in part by causing many people to flee to safety elsewhere. The Manchus later conquered the province, and during the Qing dynasty, immigration to Chongqing and Sichuan took place with the support of the Qing emperor.

In 1890, the British Consulate General was opened in Chongqing. The following year, the city became the first inland commerce port open to foreigners, with
the proviso that foreign ships should not be at liberty to trade there until Chinese-owned steamers had succeeded in ascending the river. This restriction was abolished by the Treaty of Shimonoseki in 1895, which declared the city open on the same terms as other ports, although it was not until 1907 that a steamship made the journey without the help of manual haulers. From 1896 to 1904, the American, German, French, and Japanese consulates were opened in Chongqing.

Provisional wartime capital of the Republic of China

During and after the Second Sino-Japanese War, from Nov 1937 to May 1946, it was Generalissimo Chiang Kai-shek's provisional capital. After the General and remaining army had lived there for a time following their retreat in 1938 from the previous capital of Wuhan, it was formally declared the second capital city (péi dū) on 6 September 1940. After Britain, the United States, and other Allies entered the war in Asia in December 1941, one of the Allies' deputy commanders of operations in South East Asia (South East Asia Command SEAC), Joseph Stilwell, was based in the city. This made it a city of world importance in the fight against Axis powers, together with London, Moscow and Washington, D.C. 

The city was also visited by Lord Louis Mountbatten, the Supreme Commander of SEAC which was itself headquartered in Ceylon, modern day Sri Lanka. Chiang Kai Shek as Supreme Commander in China worked closely with Stilwell. From 1938 to 1943, the city suffered from continuous massive bombing campaigns of the Imperial Japanese Navy and Army Air Forces; battles of which were fought entirely by the Chinese Air Force squadrons and anti-aircraft artillery units. Many lives were saved by the air-raid shelters which took advantage of the mountainous terrain. Chongqing was acclaimed to be the "City of Heroes" due to the indomitable spirits of its people as well as their contributions and sacrifices during the War of Resistance-World War II. Many factories and universities were relocated from eastern China and ultimately to Chongqing during years of setbacks in the war, transforming this city from inland port to a heavily industrialized city. In late November 1949, the Nationalist KMT government retreated from the city.

Municipality status

On 14 March 1997, the Eighth National People's Congress decided to merge the sub-provincial city with adjacent Fuling, Wanxian, and Qianjiang prefectures that it had governed on behalf of the province since September 1996. The resulting single entity became Chongqing Municipality, containing 30,020,000 people in forty-three former counties (without intermediate political levels). The municipality became the spearhead of China's effort to develop its western regions and to coordinate the resettlement of residents from the reservoir areas of the Three Gorges Dam project. Its first official ceremony took place on 18 June 1997.

On 8 February 2010, Chongqing became one of the four National Central/Core cities, the other three are Beijing, Shanghai and Tianjin. The same year on June 18, the Liangjiang New Area was established in Chongqing, which was the third state-level new area at the time of its establishment.

Geography

Physical geography and topography

Chongqing is situated at the transitional area between the Tibetan Plateau and the plain on the middle and lower reaches of the Yangtze River in the sub-tropical climate zone often swept by moist monsoons. It often rains at night in late spring and early summer, and thus the city is famous for its "night rain in the Ba Mountains", as described by poems throughout Chinese history including the famous Written on a Rainy Night-A Letter to the North by Li Shangyin. It borders the following provinces: Hubei in the east, Hunan in the southeast, Guizhou in the south, Sichuan in the west and northwest, and Shaanxi to the north in its northeast corner.

Chongqing covers a large area crisscrossed by rivers and mountains. The Daba Mountains stand in the north, the Wu Mountains in the east, the Wuling Mountains in the southeast, and the Dalou Mountains in the south. The whole area slopes down from north and south towards the Yangtze River valley, with sharp rises and falls. The area is featured by a large geological massif, of mountains and hills, with large sloping areas at different heights. Typical karst landscape is common in this area, and stone forests, numerous collections of peaks, limestone caves and valleys can be found in many places. The Longshuixia Gap, with its natural arch-bridges, has made the region a popular tourist attraction. Coming from northwest and running through "the Jialing Lesser Three Gorges" of Libi, Wentang and Guanyin, the Jialing River joins the Yangtze in Chongqing.

The central urban area of Chongqing, or Chongqing proper, is a city of unique features. Built on mountains and partially surrounded by the Yangtze and Jialing rivers, it is known as a "mountain city" and a "city on rivers". The night scene of the city is very illuminated, with millions of lights and their reflection on the rivers. With its special topographical features, Chongqing has the unique scenery of mountains, rivers, forests, springs, waterfalls, gorges, and caves. Li Bai, a famous poet of the Tang dynasty, was inspired by the natural scenery and wrote this epigram.

Specifically, the central urban area is located on a huge folding area. Yuzhong District, Nan'an District, Shapingba District and Jiangbei District are located right on a big syncline. And the "Southern Mountain of Chongqing" (Tongluo Mountain), along with the Zhongliang Mountain are two anticlines next to the syncline of downtown.

Zhongliang Mountains and Tongluo Mountains roughly forms the eastern and western boundaries of Chongqing's urban area. The highest point in downtown is the top of Eling Hill, which is a smaller syncline hill that separates the Yangtze River and Jialing River. The lowest point is Chaotian Gate, where the two rivers merge with each other.

Climate 

Chongqing has a humid subtropical climate (Köppen Cfa), bordering on a monsoonal humid subtropical climate (Köppen Cwa) and for most of the year experiences very high relative humidity, with all months above 75%. Winters are short and somewhat mild, but damp and overcast. The city's location in the Sichuan Basin causes it to have one of the lowest annual sunshine totals nationally, at only 1,055 hours, lower than much of Northern Europe; the monthly percent possible sunshine in the city proper ranges from a mere 8% in December and January to 48% in August.

Chongqing, with over 100 days of fog per year, is known as the "Fog City"; this is because in the spring and fall, a thick layer of fog enshrouds it for 68 days per year. During the Second Sino-Japanese War, this special weather possibly played a role in protecting the city from being overrun by the Imperial Japanese Army.

As exemplified by Youyang County below, conditions are often cooler in the southeast part of the municipality due to the higher elevations there.

Cityscape

Politics 

Since 1997 Chongqing has been a direct-controlled municipality in the Chinese administrative structure, making it a provincial-level division with commensurate political importance. The municipality's top leader is the secretary of the municipal committee of the Chinese Communist Party ("party chief"), which, since 2007, has also held a seat on the Politburo of the Chinese Communist Party, the country's second highest governing council. Under the Soviet-inspired nomenklatura system of appointments, individuals are appointed to the position by the central leadership of the Communist Party, and bestowed to an official based on seniority and adherence to party orthodoxy, usually given to an individual with prior regional experience elsewhere in China and nearly never a native of Chongqing. Notable individuals who have held the municipal Party Secretary position include He Guoqiang, Wang Yang, Bo Xilai, Zhang Dejiang, and Sun Zhengcai, the latter three were Politburo members during their term as party chief. The party chief heads the municipal party standing committee, the de facto top governing council of the municipality. The standing committee is typically composed of 13 individuals which includes the party chiefs of important subdivisions and other leading figures in the local party and government organization, as well as one military representative.

The municipal People's Government serves as the day-to-day administrative authority, and is headed by the mayor, who is assisted by numerous vice mayors and mayoral assistants. Each vice mayor is given jurisdiction over specific municipal departments. The mayor is the second-highest-ranking official in the municipality. The mayor usually represents the city when foreign guests visit.

The municipality also has a People's Congress, theoretically elected by lower level People's Congresses. The People's Congress nominally appoints the mayor and approves the nominations of other government officials. The People's Congress, like those of other provincial jurisdictions, is generally seen as a symbolic body. It convenes in full once a year to approve party-sponsored resolutions and local regulations and duly confirm party-approved appointments. On occasion the People's Congress can be venues of discussion on municipal issues, although this is dependent on the actions of individual delegates. The municipal People's Congress is headed by a former municipal official, usually in their late fifties or sixties, with a lengthy prior political career in Chongqing. The municipal Political Consultative Conference (zhengxie) meets at around the same time as the People's Congress. Its role is to advise on political issues. The zhengxie is headed by a leader who is typically a former municipal or regional official with a lengthy career in the party and government bureaucracy.

Military
Chongqing was the wartime capital of China during the Second Sino-Japanese War (i.e., World War II), and from 1938 to 1946, the seat of administration for the Republic of China's government before its departure to Nanjing and then Taiwan. After the eventual defeat at the Battle of Wuhan General Chiang-Kai Shek and the army were forced to use it as base of resistance from 1938 onwards. It also contains a military museum named after the Chinese Korean War hero Qiu Shaoyun.

Chongqing used to be the headquarters of the 13th Group Army of the People's Liberation Army, one of the two group armies that formerly comprised the Chengdu Military Region, which in 2016 was re-organized into the Western Theater Command.

Administrative divisions 

Chongqing is the largest of the four direct-controlled municipalities of the People's Republic of China. The municipality is divided into 38 subdivisions (3 were abolished in 1997, and Wansheng and Shuangqiao districts were abolished in October 2011), consisting of 26 districts, 8 counties, and 4 autonomous counties. At the end of year 2018, the total population is 31.02 million.

Urban areas

Central Chongqing

 Yuzhong District (literally "Central Chongqing District"), the central and most densely populated district, where government and international business offices and the city's best shopping are located in the district's Jiefangbei CBD area. Yuzhong is located on the peninsula surrounded by Eling Hill, Yangtze River and Jialing River.
 Jiangbei District (literally "North of the River District"), located to the north of Jialing River.
 Shapingba District, roughly located between Jialing River and Zhongliang Mountain.
 Jiulongpo District, roughly located between Yangtze River and Zhongliang Mountain.
 Nan'an District (literally "Southern Bank District"), located on the south side of Yangtze River.
 Dadukou District
 Banan District (literally "Southern of Ba District"). Previously called Ba County, and changed to the current name in 1994.
 Yubei District (or "Northern Chongqing District"). Previously called Jiangbei County, and changed into the current name in 1994.
 Beibei District, a satellite district northwest of Chongqing.

Demographics

Population 

According to a July 2010 article from the official Xinhua news agency, the municipality has a population of 32.8 million, including 23.3 million farmers. Among them, 8.4 million farmers have become migrant workers, including 3.9 million working and living in urban areas of Chongqing.
, the metropolitan area encompassing the central urban area was estimated by the OECD to have, a population of 17 million.

This would mean that the locally registered farmers who work in other jurisdictions number 4.5 million, reducing the local, year-round population of Chongqing in 2010 to 28.3 million, plus those who are registered in other jurisdictions but live and work in Chongqing. According to China's 2005 statistical yearbook, of a total population of 30.55 million, those with residence registered in other jurisdictions but residing in the Chongqing enumeration area numbered 1.4 million, including 46,000 who resided in Chongqing "for less than half-year". An additional 83,000 had registered in Chongqing, but not yet settled there.

The 2005 statistical yearbook also lists 15.22 million (49.82%) males and 15.33 million (50.18%) females.

In terms of age distribution in 2004, of the 30.55 million total population, 6.4 million (20.88%) were age 0–14, 20.7 million (67.69%) were 15–64, and 3.5 million (11.46%) were 65 and over.

Of a total 10,470,000 households (2004), 1,360,000 consisted of one person, 2,940,000 two-person, 3,190,000 three-person, 1,790,000 four-person, 783,000 five-person, 270,000 six-person, 89,000 seven-person, 28,000 eight-person, 6,000 nine-person, and 10,000 households of 10 or more persons per household.

Religion 

The predominant religions in Chongqing are Chinese folk religions, Taoist traditions and Chinese Buddhism. According to surveys conducted in 2007 and 2009, 26.63% of the population believes and is involved in cults of ancestors, while 1.05% of the population identifies as Christian (see also Christianity in Sichuan).

The reports did not give figures for other types of religion; 72.32% of the population may be either irreligious or involved in worship of nature deities, Buddhism, Confucianism, Taoism, or folk religious sects.

In 2010, there were 9,056 Muslims in Chongqing.

Economy

Chongqing is facing rapid urbanization. For instance, statistics suggest that new construction added approximately  daily of usable floor space to satisfy demands for residential, commercial and factory space. Thus, Chongqing was separated from Sichuan province and made into a municipality in its own right on 14 March 1997 in order to accelerate its development and subsequently China's relatively poorer western areas (see China Western Development strategy). By the 2000s the city had become an important industrial area in western China.

, the economy of Chongqing was China's 16th largest economy with a GDP of CNY¥ 2,789 billion or USD$439 billion in (nominal), which is equivalent to the GDP of Nigeria, the largest economy in Africa. However, its overall economic performance is still lagging behind coastal cities such as Shanghai, Shenzhen and Guangzhou. For example, its GDP per capita was 87,000 yuan (USD13,400 $), which is around the national average. Nevertheless, there is a massive government push to transform Chongqing into the region's economic, trade, and financial center and use the municipality as a platform to open up the country's western interior to further development.

Compared to a country, it would be the 33rd-largest economy and the 45th most populous with the total perminant population of 32.05 millions as of 2021.

Chongqing has been identified by the Economist Intelligence Unit in the November 2010 Access China White Paper as a member of the CHAMPS (Chongqing, Hefei, Anshan, Maanshan, Pingdingshan and Shenyang), an economic profile of the top 20 emerging cities in China.

Traditionally, due to its geographic inaccessibility, Chongqing and Sichuan have both been important military bases in weapons research and development. Even though Chongqing's industries are diversified, unlike eastern China, its export sector is small due to its relatively disadvantageous inland location. Instead, factories producing local-oriented consumer goods such as processed food, cars, chemicals, textiles, machinery, sports equipment and electronics are common.

Chongqing is China's third largest motor vehicle production center and the largest for motorcycles. In 2007, it had an annual output capacity of 1 million cars and 8.6 million motorcycles. Leading makers of cars and motorbikes includes China's fourth biggest automaker; Changan Automotive Corp and Lifan Hongda Enterprise, as well as Ford Motor Company, with the US car giant having 3 plants in Chongqing. The municipality is also one of China's nine largest iron and steel producers in China as well as one of its three major aluminum producers. Important manufacturers include Chongqing Iron and Steel Company (重庆钢铁股份有限公司) and Southwest Aluminum (西南鋁業), which is Asia's largest aluminum plant. Agriculture remains significant. Rice and fruits, especially oranges, are the area's main produce. Natural resources are also abundant with large deposits of coal, natural gas, and more than 40 kinds of minerals such as strontium and manganese. Chuandong Natural Gas Field is China's largest inland gas field with deposits of around 270 billion m3 – more than 1/5 of China's total. Has China's largest reserve of strontium (China has the world's 2nd biggest strontium deposit). Manganese is mined in the Xiushan area. Although the mining sector has been denounced as heavily polluting and unsafe. Chongqing is also planned to be the site of a 10 million ton capacity refinery operated by CNPC (parent company of PetroChina) to process imported crude oil from the Sino-Burma pipelines. The pipeline itself, though not yet finished, will eventually run from Sittwe (in Myanmar's western coast) through Kunming in Yunnan before reaching Chongqing and it will provide China with fuels sourced from Myanmar, the Middle East and Africa. Recently, there has been a drive to move up the value chain by shifting towards high technology and knowledge intensive industries resulting in new development zones such as the Chongqing New North Zone (CNNZ). Chongqing's local government is hoping through the promotion of favorable economic policies for the electronics and information technology sectors, that it can create a 400 billion RMB high technology manufacturing hub which will surpass its car industry and account for 25% of its exports.

The city has also invested heavily in infrastructure to attract investment. The network of roads and railways connecting Chongqing to the rest of China has been expanded and upgraded reducing logistical costs. Furthermore, the nearby Three Gorges Dam which is the world's largest, supplies Chongqing with power and allows oceangoing ships to reach Chongqing's Yangtze River port. These infrastructure improvements have led to the arrivals of numerous foreign direct investors (FDI) in industries ranging from car to finance and retailing; such as Ford, Mazda, HSBC, Standard Chartered Bank, Citibank, Deutsche Bank, ANZ Bank, Scotiabank, Wal-Mart, Metro AG and Carrefour, among other multinational corporations.

Economic and technological development zones
The city includes a number of economic and technological development zones:
 Chongqing Chemical Industrial Park
 Chongqing Economic & Technological Development Zone
 Chongqing Hi-Tech Industry Development Zone
 Chongqing New North Zone (CNNZ)
 Chongqing Export Processing Zone
 Jianqiao Industrial Park (located in Dadukou District)
 Liangjiang New Area
 Liangjiang Cloud Computing Center (the largest of its kind in China)

Chongqing itself is part of the West Triangle Economic Zone, along with Chengdu and Xi'an.

Education 
As of 2022, Chongqing hosts 70 institutions of higher education (excluding adult colleges), making it the fourth city with most higher education institutions nationwide and the first city in Southwest China, which comprises Chongqing, Sichuan Province, Guizhou Province, Yunnan Province, and Tibet Autonomous Region with a combination of more than 180 million population.

Colleges and universities 

Chongqing University
Southwest University
Chongqing University of Science and Technology
Southwest University of Political Science and Law
Third Military Medical University
Chongqing University of Posts and Telecommunications
Chongqing University of Technology
Chongqing Jiaotong University
Chongqing Medical University
Chongqing Normal University
Chongqing Technology and Business University
Chongqing Three Gorges University
Chongqing Telecommunication Institute
Sichuan Fine Arts Institute
Sichuan International Studies University
University of Logistics
Chongqing University of Arts and Science
Yangtze Normal University
 Chongqing University of Education

Notable high schools 

 Chongqing Changshou Middle School
 Fuling Experimental High School
 Chongqing No.1 Secondary School
 Chongqing Nankai Secondary School
 Chongqing No.8 Secondary School
 Bashu Secondary School
 Chongqing Railway High School
 Chongqing Yucai Secondary School
 Chongqing Foreign Language School (The High School Affiliated to Sichuan International Studies University )
 Verakin High School of Chongqing (The 2nd Chongqing Foreign Language School)
 Chongqing Qiujing High School
 High School Affiliated to Southwest University
 Chongqing NO.18 Secondary School

International schools 
 Yew Chung International School of Chongqing
 KL International School of Chongqing Bashu

Transport
Since its elevation to national-level municipality in 1997, the city has dramatically expanded its transportation infrastructure. With the construction of railways and expressways to the east and southeast, Chongqing is a major transportation hub in southwestern China.

, the municipality had 31 bridges across the Yangtze River including over a dozen in the city's urban core. Aside from the city's first two Yangtze River bridges, which were built, respectively, in 1960 and 1977, all of the other bridges were completed since 1995.

Public transit

Chongqing Rail Transit

Public transport in Chongqing consists of metro, intercity railway, a ubiquitous bus system and the world's largest monorail network.

According to the Chongqing Municipal Government's ambitious plan in May 2007, Chongqing is investing 150 billion RMB over 13 years to finish a system that combines underground metro lines with heavy monorail.

Line 6, runs between Beibei, a district in the city's far north to downtown. Line 5 opened in late 2017.

By 2050, Chongqing will have as many as 18 lines that are planned to be in operation.

Aerial tramway

Chongqing is the only Chinese city that keeps public aerial tramways. Historically there were three aerial tramways in Chongqing: the Yangtze River Tramway, the Jialing River Tramway and the South Mountain Tramway. Currently, only Yangtze River Tramway is still operating and it is Class 4A Tourist Attractions in China. The -long tramway connects the southern and northern banks of Yangtze River; its daily passenger volume is about 10,000.

Railways

Major railway stations in Chongqing:

Chongqing railway station in Yuzhong, accessible via Metro Lines 1 & 3 (Lianglukou Metro station), is the city's oldest railway station and located near the Jiefangbei CBD in the city center. The station handles mostly long-distance trains. There are plans for a major renovation and overhaul of this station, thus many services have been transferred to Chongqing North railway station.
Chongqing North railway station is a station handling many long-distance services and high-speed rail services to Chengdu, Beijing and other cities. It was completed in 2006 and is connected to Metro Line.
Chongqing West railway station is in Shapingba, a station handling many long-distance services and high-speed rail services to many cities. It was completed in 2018.
Shapingba railway station is in Shapingba, near Shapingba CBD, accessible via Shapingba metro station on Lines 1, 9 and the Loop line. It handles many local and regional train services. It was completed in 2018.
Another railway station, Chongqing East, is currently under construction and is expected to be completed in 2025.

Chongqing is a major freight destination for rail with continued development with improved handling facilities. Due to subsidies and incentives, the relocation and construction of many factories in Chongqing has seen a huge increase in rail traffic.

Chongqing is a major rail hub regionally.
Chengdu–Chongqing railway (to Chengdu, Sichuan Province)
Sichuan–Guizhou railway (to Guiyang, Guizhou Province)
Xiangyang–Chongqing railway (to Hubei Province)
Chongqing–Huaihua railway (to Hunan Province)
Suining–Chongqing railway (to Sichuan Province)
Chongqing–Lichuan railway (to Hubei Province)
Chongqing–Lanzhou railway railway (to Gansu Province)

River port

Chongqing is one of the most important inland ports in China. There are numerous luxury cruise ships that terminate at Chongqing, cruising downstream along the Yangtze River to Yichang, Wuhan, Nanjing or even Shanghai. In the recent past, this provided virtually the only transportation option along the river. However, improved rail, expressways and air travel have seen this ferry traffic reduced or cancelled altogether. Most of the river ferry traffic consists of leisure cruises for tourists rather than local needs. Improved access by larger cargo vessels has been made due to the construction of the Three Gorges Dam. This allows bulk transport of goods along the Yangtze River. Coal, raw minerals and containerized goods provide the majority of traffic plying this section of the river. Several port handling facilities exist throughout the city, including many impromptu river bank sites.

Highways
Traditionally, the road network in Chongqing has been narrow, winding and limited to smaller vehicles because of the natural terrain, large rivers and the huge population demands on the area, especially in the Yuzhong District. In other places, such as Jiangbei, large areas of homes and buildings have recently been cleared to improve the road network and create better urban planning; thus, several ring roads have also been constructed. This has seen many tunnels and large bridges needing to be built across the city. The construction of many expressways have connected Chongqing to its neighbors. The natural mountainous terrain that Chongqing is built on makes many road projects difficult to construct, including for example some of the world's highest road bridges.

Unlike many other Chinese cities, it is rare for motorbikes, electric scooters or bicycles to be seen on Chongqing's Roads. This is due to the extremely hilly and mountainous nature of Chongqing's roads and streets. However, despite this, Chongqing is a manufacturing center for these types of vehicles.

 Chongqing-Chengdu Expressway
 Chongqing-Chengdu 2nd Expressway (under construction)
 Chongqing-Wanzhou-Yichang Highway (Wanzhou-Yichang section under construction)
 Chongqing-Guiyang Highway
 Chongqing-Changsha Expressway (Xiushan-Changsha section under construction)
 Chongqing-Dazhou-Xi'a Highway (Dazhou-Xi'an section under construction)
 Chongqing-Suining Expressway
 Chongqing-Nanchong Expressway
 China National Highway 210
 China National Highway 212

Bridges

With so many bridges crossing the Yangtze and Jialing rivers in the urban area, Chongqing is sometimes known as the 'Bridge Capital of China'. The first important bridge in urban Chongqing was the Niujiaotuo Jialing River Bridge, built in 1958. The first bridge over the Yangtze river was the Shibanpo Yangtze River Bridge (or Chongqing Yangtze River Bridge) built in 1977.

, within the area of the 9 districts, there were 20 bridges on the Yangtze river and 28 bridges on the Jialing river. The bridges in Chongqing exhibit a variety of shapes and structures, making Chongqing a showcase for bridge design.

Airports

The major airport of Chongqing is Chongqing Jiangbei International Airport (IATA: CKG, ICAO: ZUCK). It is located in Yubei District. The airport offers a growing network of direct flights to China, South East Asia, the Middle East, North America, and Europe. Jiangbei airport is a hub for China Southern Airlines, Chongqing Airlines, Sichuan Airlines, China Express Airlines, Shandong Airlines and Hainan Airlines's new China West Air. Chongqing also is a focus city of Air China, therefore it is very well connected with Star Alliance and Skyteam's international network. The airport currently has three parallel runways in operation. It serves domestic routes to most other Chinese cities, as well as international routes to Auckland, New York City, London, Los Angeles, Moscow, Doha, Dubai, Seoul, Bangkok, Phuket, Osaka, Singapore, Chiang Mai, Phnom Penh, Siem Reap, Malé, Bali, Tokyo, Kuala Lumpur, Batam, Rome and Helsinki. , Jiangbei Airport was the 4th busiest airport in terms of passenger traffic in mainland China.

Currently, Jiangbei airport has three terminals. Chongqing Airport has metro access (CRT Line 3 and Line 10) to its central city, and two runways in normal use.

There are four other airports in Chongqing Municipality: Qianjiang Wulingshan Airport, Wanzhou Wuqiao Airport, Chongqing Xiannüshan Airport, and Chongqing Wushan Airport. They are all class 4C airports and serve passenger flights to domestic destinations including Beijing, Shanghai and Kunming.

Culture

Language

The language native to Chongqing is Southwestern Mandarin. More precisely, the great majority of the municipality, save for Xiushan, speak Sichuanese, including the primary Chengdu-Chongqing dialect and Minjiang dialect spoken in Jiangjin and Qijiang. There are also a few speakers of Xiang and Hakka in the municipality, due to the great immigration wave to the Sichuan region during the Ming and Qing dynasties. In addition, in parts of southeastern Chongqing, the Miao and Tujia languages are also used by some Miao and Tujia people.

Tourism

As the provisional Capital of China for almost ten years (1937 to 1945), the city was also known as one of the three headquarters of the Allies during World War II, as well as being a strategic center of many other wars throughout China's history. Chongqing has many historic war-time buildings or sites, some of which have since been destroyed. These sites include the People's Liberation Monument, located in the center of Chongqing city. It used to be the highest building in the area, but is now surrounded and dwarfed by numerous shopping centers. Originally named the Monument for the Victory over Axis Armies, it is the only building in China for that purpose. Today, the monument serves as a symbol for the city. The General Joseph W. Stilwell Museum, dedicated to General "Vinegar Joe" Stilwell, a World War II general. the air force cemetery in the Nanshan area, in memory of those air force personnel killed during the Second Sino-Japanese War (1937–1945), and the Red Rock Village Museum, a diplomatic site for the Communist Party in Chongqing led by Zhou Enlai during World War II, and Guiyuan, Cassia Garden, where Mao Zedong signed the "Double 10 (10 October) Peace Agreement" with the Kuomintang in 1945.

 The Baiheliang Underwater Museum, China's first underwater museum,
 The Memorial of Great Tunnel Massacre, a former air-raid shelter where a major massacre occurred during World War II.
 The Great Hall of the People in Chongqing is based on the Great Hall of the People in Beijing. This is one of the largest public assembly buildings in China which, though built in modern times, emulates traditional architectural styles. It is adjacent to the densely populated and hilly central district, with narrow streets and pedestrian only walkways,
 The large domed Three Gorges Museum presents the history, culture, and environment of the Three Gorges area and Chongqing.
 Chongqing Art Museum is known for striking architecture.
 Chongqing Science and Technology Museum has an IMAX theater.
 Luohan Si, a Ming dynasty temple,
 Huangguan Escalator, the second longest escalator in Asia.
 Former sites for embassies of major countries during the 1940s. As the capital at that time, Chongqing had many residential and other buildings for these officials.
 Wuxi County, noted as a major tourism area of Chongqing,
 The Dazu Rock Carvings, in Dazu county, are a series of Chinese religious sculptures and carvings, dating back as far as the 7th century A.D., depicting and influenced by Buddhist, Confucian and Taoist beliefs. Listed as a UNESCO World Heritage Site, the Dazu Rock Carvings are made up of 75 protected sites containing some 50,000 statues, with over 100,000 Chinese characters forming inscriptions and epigraphs.,
 The Three Natural Bridges and Furong Cave in Wulong Karst National Geology Park, Wulong County are listed as a UNESCO World Heritage Site as part of the South China Karst,
 Ciqikou is a 1000-year-old town in the Shapingba District of Chongqing. It is also known as "Little Chongqing". The town, located next to the lower reaches of the Jialing River, was at one time an important source of china-ware and used to be a busy commercial dock during the Ming and Qing dynasties,
 Fishing Town or Fishing City is one of the three great ancient battlefields of China. It is noted for its resistance to the Mongol armies during the Southern Song dynasty (1127–1279) and the location where the Mongol leader Möngke Khan died in 1259,
 Xueyu Cave in Fengdu County is the only example of a pure-white, jade-like karst cave in China,
 Fengdu Ghost City in Fengdu County is the Gate of the Hell in traditional Chinese literature and culture.
 Snowy Jade Cave, see Xueyu Cave (above).
 Baidi Cheng, a peninsula in Yangtze River, known due to a famous poem by Li Bai.
 The Chongqing Zoo, a zoo that exhibits many rare species including the giant panda, the extremely rare South China tiger, and the African elephant.
 Chongqing Amusement Park.
 Chongqing Grand Theater, a performing arts center.
 Foreigners' Street was an amusement park, including the Porcelain Palace, the world's largest toilet. Also the location of the abortive Love Land development in 2009.
 The Black Mountain Valley (Heishangu).
 Hongya Cave (aka Hongya Dong), a pier stilt house fortress that served as one of the 17 city gates of Ancient Chongqing is a popular tourist attraction for its architecture.

Cuisine
Chongqing food is part of Sichuan cuisine. Chongqing is known for its spicy food. Its food is normally considered numbing because of the use of Sichuan pepper, also known as Sichuan peppercorn, containing hydroxy alpha sanshool. Chongqing's city center has many restaurants and food stalls where meals often cost less than RMB10. Local specialties here include dumplings and pickled vegetables and, different from many other Chinese cuisines, Chongqing dishes are suitable for the solo diner as they are often served in small individual sized portions. Among the delicacies and local specialties are these dishes:

 Chongqing hot pot– Chongqing's local culinary specialty which was originally from Northern China. Tables in hot pot restaurants usually have a central pot, where food ordered by the customers is boiled in a spicy broth, items such as beef, pork, tripe, kidney slices, pork aorta and goose intestine are often consumed.
 Chongqing Xiao Mian – a common lamian noodle dish tossed with chili oil and rich mixtures of spices and ingredients
 Jiangtuan fish – since Chongqing is located along Jialing River, visitors have a good opportunity to sample varieties of aquatic products. Among them, is a fish local to the region, Jiangtuan fish: Hypophthalmichthys nobilis although more commonly known as bighead carp. The fish is often served steamed or baked.Wanzhou district is famous for baking Jiangtuan fish.

 Suan La Fen (Sour and Spicy Sweet-Potato Noodles) – Thick, transparent noodles of rubbery texture in a spicy vinegar soup.
 Lazi Ji (Spicy Chicken) – A stir-fried dish consists of marinated then deep-fried pieces of chicken, dried Sichuan chili peppers, Sichuan peppers, garlic, and ginger, originated near Geleshan in Chongqing.
 Quanshui Ji (Spring Water Chicken) – Quanshui Ji is cooked with the natural spring water in the Southern Mountain of Chongqing.
 Pork leg cooked with rock sugar – A common household dish of Chongqing, the tender, reddish finished dish, has been described as having strong and sweet aftertaste.
 Qianzhang (skimmed soy bean cream) – Qianzhang is the cream skimmed from soybean milk. In order to create this, several steps must be followed very carefully. First, soybeans are soaked in water, ground, strained, boiled, restrained several times and spread over gauze until delicate, snow-white cream is formed. The paste can also be hardened, cut into slivers and seasoned with sesame oil, garlic and chili oil. Another variation is to bake the cream and fry it with bacon, which is described as soft and sweet.

Media
The Chongqing People's Broadcast Station is Chongqing's largest radio station. The only municipal-level TV network is Chongqing TV, claimed to be the 4th largest television station in China. Chongqing TV broadcasts many local-oriented channels, and can be viewed on many TV sets throughout China.

Sports and recreation

Basketball
Chongqing Soaring Dragons became the 20th team playing in Chinese Basketball Association in 2013. They play at Datianwan Arena, in the same sporting complex as Datianwan Stadium. The team moved to Beijing in 2015 and is currently known as Beijing Royal Fighters.

Soccer
Professional soccer teams in Chongqing include:
 Chongqing Lifan (Chinese Super League)
 Chongqing F.C., folded

Chongqing Lifan is a professional Chinese soccer club that currently plays in the Chinese Super League. They are owned by the Chongqing-based Lifan Group, which manufactures motorcycles, cars and spare parts. Originally called Qianwei (Vanguard) Wuhan, the club formed in 1995 to take part in the recently developed, fully professional Chinese Soccer League. They would quickly rise to top tier of the system and experience their greatest achievement in winning the 2000 Chinese FA Cup, and coming in fourth within the league. However, since then they have struggled to replicate the same success, and have twice been relegated from the top tier.

Chongqing FC was a soccer club located in the city that competed in China League One, the country's second-tier soccer division, before being relegated to the China League Two, and dissolved due to a resultant lack of funds.

Sport venues
Sport venues in Chongqing include:
 The Chongqing Olympic Sports Center is a multipurpose stadium. It is currently used mostly for soccer matches, as it has a grass surface, and can hold 58,680. It was built in 2002 and was one of main venues for the 2004 AFC Asian Cup.
 Yanghe Stadium is a multiuse stadium that is currently used mostly for soccer matches. The stadium holds 32,000 people, and is the home of Chongqing Lifan in the Chinese Super League. The stadium was purchased by the Lifan Group in 2001 for RMB80 million and immediately replaced Datianwan Stadium as the home of Chongqing Lifan.
 Datianwan Stadium is a multipurpose stadium that is currently used mostly for soccer matches. The stadium has a capacity 32,000 people, and up until 2001 was the home of Chongqing Lifan.

Cloud Valley
At the end of 2020, a collaboration between a Danish architecture firm and a Chinese tech company Terminus was announced, taking the form of an AI-controlled campus. The project is named Cloud Valley and aims to use sensors and WiFi-controlled devices to collect data on the city's residents and atmosphere, including weather and eating and sleeping habits. The AI will adapt devices to work in a way that fits the gathered information and improves residents' lives.

Notable people 

 Ba Manzi: a legendary hero of Ba kingdom in Zhou dynasty
 Ba Qing, the Widow: the earliest known female merchant in Chinese history who provided huge financial aid to Qin Shi Huang to construct the Great Wall
 Gan Ning: a general serving under warlord Sun Quan in the last years of Han dynasty
 Yan Yan: a loyal general during Three Kingdoms period
 Lanxi Daolong: a famous Buddhism monk and philosopher in Song dynasty who went to Japan and established the Kenchō-ji
 Qin Liangyu: a popular heroine in Ming dynasty who fought against Manchus
 Nie Rongzhen: marshal of the People's Liberation Army of China
 Liu Bocheng: an early leader of Chinese communist party during Anti-Japanese War
 Lu Zuofu: a notable patriotic industrialist and businessman who was a member of Chinese United League and a leader of Railway Protection Movement, established the Beibei District, Chongqing Natural History Museum, Jianshan High School, the Northern Hot Spring Park of Chongqing and Beibei Library, and served as the chief official of Food Bureau during Republic of China period.
 Liu Yongqing: wife of the former president and Party general secretary Hu Jintao
 Zhonghua Pang: a well-known calligrapher and geologist born in Sichuan but raised and lived in Chongqing
 Liu Xiaoqing: an actress
 Xia Peisu: Chinese computer scientist
 Chen Kun: Chinese actor and singer
 Huang Qian: Chess player  
 Tian Liang: Olympic diving gold medalist
 Li Yundi: a pianist
 Karry Wang: A member of the pop band TFBoys and an actor
 Roy Wang: a singer-songwriter and member of TFBoys, also an actor and TV host
 Huang Junjie : an actor
 Jiang Qinqin: an actress
 Li Hua: artist who studied in Europe
 Xiao Zhan: actor, singer, and member of the boy group X Nine
 Pan Wenhua: born in Renshou County, Sichuan Province, was a famous military general who was regarded as a born military prodigy
 Zhou Zhennan: a leader of C-pop group R1SE
 Shi Tingmao: Olympic diving gold medalist
 Chen Zihan : Actress
 Shuguang Zhang : biochemist
 Xia Li: Professional wrestler signed with WWE
 Feng Timo : Singer, pop-star and internet personality
 Meng Fei : Prime time television host
 Li Ying (footballer, born 1993): First Chinese Soccer Player to come out as Lesbian
 Domee Shi: Chinese-Canadian animator, director and screenwriter
 Lei Tingjie: chess grandmaster
 Wang Ziqi : brothel madam described as the 'Godmother' of prostitution, executed aged 35 in 2011 after being convicted of organizing and leading a criminal organization

International relations

Consulates

Twin towns – sister cities

Chongqing has sister city relationships with many cities of the world including:

 Toulouse, France (1982)
 Seattle, United States (1983)
 Toronto, Canada (1986)
 Hiroshima, Japan (1986)
 Leicester, United Kingdom (1993)
 Voronezh, Russia (1993)
 Zaporizhzhia, Ukraine (2002)
 Mpumalanga, South Africa (2002)
 Sliven, Bulgaria (2002)
 Düsseldorf, Germany (2004)
 Brisbane, Australia (2005)
 Shiraz, Iran (2005)
 Aswan, Egypt (2005)
 Busan, South Korea (2007)
 Sør-Trøndelag, Norway (2007)
 Chiang Mai Province, Thailand (2008)
 Córdoba, Argentina (2010)
 Budapest, Hungary (2010)
 Bangkok, Thailand (2005)
 Antwerp, Belgium (2011)
 Salvador, Bahia, Brazil (2011)
 Chennai, India (2015)
 Maribor, Slovenia (2017)
 Telde, Spain (2018)

See also 

 List of cities in China by population and built-up area
 List of twin towns and sister cities in China
 Major national historical and cultural sites in Chongqing

Notes

References

Citations

Sources 
 General

External links 

 Chongqing Municipal Government website
 Chongqing gongfutiyu website
 Chongqing Jushen Sports website

 
5th-century BC establishments in China
Metropolitan areas of China
Municipalities of China
Populated places established in the 5th century BC
Populated places on the Yangtze River
Port cities and towns in China
Province-level divisions of China
States and territories established in 1997
Western China